Manabu Murakami (shinjitai 村上 学, kyūjitai 村上 學, Murakami Manabu; born 1936) is a Japanese scholar specializing in medieval Japanese literature.

Publications

Works cited 

1936 births
Living people